The Walkersville Southern Railroad (reporting mark WS) is a 6.72 mile (11 km) heritage railway in Walkersville, Maryland. running from MP 60.0 south of Woodsboro, MD to MP 66.72 just north of the intersection of Route 26 and U.S. Route 15 near Frederick, Maryland (Using PRR Milepost data where mileage ran north to south, and Frederick was at MP 69.0).

History
The Walkersville Southern Railroad runs track and structures originally built by the Frederick and Pennsylvania Line railroad. This railroad ran from Frederick, Md to the Pennsylvania-Maryland State line, or Mason–Dixon line near Kingsdale,PA. Chartered in 1867, the railroad started construction in 1869 and cost $868,687.50 ($=). It opened October 8, 1872 and was subsequently leased to the Pennsylvania Railroad from January 1, 1875, and in July of that year, PRR formed a new division, the Frederick division to operate the rail line. In the spring of 1896, it was liquidated in a judicial sale to the Pennsylvania Railroad for 10% of its 1896 book value. Pennsylvania reorganized the railroad in December, 1896 as the Frederick and Northern Railroad Company. In March 1897, this new company was itself merged with other Pennsylvania-controlled railways (Littlestown Railroad and the Hanover and York Railroad Company) into the Hanover and York Railroad Company, chartered under the general laws of Pennsylvania and Maryland. In 1914, this railroad and the newly built Central Railroad of Maryland were then merged into the York, Hanover and Frederick Railway Company which remained a wholly owned stock subsidiary of the PRR into the creation of the PennDel company on December 31, 1953  and then the Penn Central merger in 1968 and then bankruptcy in 1970. The Frederick and Pennsylvania Line segment was transferred to the State of Maryland in 1982 for unpaid taxes.

One of the industries that fed the railroad during its earliest time of operations was the Lime Kiln in Walkersville. This was among the industries that fueled the need of the railroad, to ship fertilizer to farmers in and around the Walkersville region. The Frederick Secondary remained in the control of the Pennsylvania Railroad even into the creation of the Penn Central Railroad. The Walkersville Southern operates on part of the Penn Central's Frederick Secondary. Penn Central, then in bankruptcy, sold the line to the state of Maryland in 1972 after Hurricane Agnes washed out the bridge over the Monocacy River. The line remained dormant until 1980 when the Maryland Midland Railway began operations over the route between Walkersville north to Taneytown. South of Walkersville the right-of-way, devoid of freight customers, was overtaken by brush and weeds.

Volunteers for the new Walkersville Southern began restoring the line in 1991. The State of Maryland awarded the company operation of the line south of Walkersville in 1993 and tourist trains began running to the Monocacy River in 1995. The bridge was rebuilt, completed in March 1996, and trains began crossing the river, 23 years after Agnes. In 1998, the line was rebuilt to its current terminus at Maryland Route 26 in Frederick. Although crossing Maryland Route 26 was in the original plan to reach potential freight customers in downtown Frederick, the rise in automobile traffic over Route 26 and the departure of potential customers from Frederick led to the eventual abandonment of any further restoration plans into the city. Current local government plans call for the old right-of-way south of Route 26 to be converted into a hiker-biker trail.

In November 2008, Maryland granted rights to operate three miles of right-of-way to the north, linking to the Maryland Midland Railway at North Glade Road.  In 2013 the summer steam excursion was routed over a portion of the newly restored track. As of the January 1st, 2014 the north division has been restored.

Operations
Today, the railroad runs two to three round trips daily on Saturdays and Sundays in May, June, September, and October; and on Saturdays only in July and August.  They also host some special events, including some on weekends and during the off-season such as a railfan trip with a visiting steam tank engine, or Santa trains during the Christmas season. In some cases individuals with their own equipment can use the right of way with prior permission or during selected special events.

The railroad typically operates unique industrial diesel locomotives, all rarely seen in today's modern railroading. In 2012, the railroad operated steam excursions for the first time using the Gramling Locomotive Works "Flagg Coal 75" an 0-4-0T tank engine. The 75's operation marked the first time a steam locomotive had operated on this railway since the Pennsylvania Railroad last ran steam over 60 years ago. In 2013, steam returned in the form of Lehigh Valley Coal 126, also owned by the Gramling family. In 2018, after the addition of Crossing Signals the railroad turned to Jeddo Coal 85, also owned by the GLW, due to 126's blind axle causing problems with the activation devices at the crossing.

Diesel locomotives

Rolling Stock

The Pullman solarium car, named the Meadow Lark, was donated to the Chesapeake Railway Association and later turned over to the WS, which continues to restore it. The railroad uses it on dinner trains as a dressing room for dinner theater actors and as a mount for a generator (attached to the car's underside) for providing electrical power to the train. In addition to the RF&P 923 and Wabash 2827 cabooses hosted for the CRA, the railroad also hosts a number of private equipment for multiple individuals. For example, there is a private but once active PRR N5 in the yard.

Also operated by Walkersville Southern, but not used in revenue service, are an ex-US Navy ammunition box car, used as a shop car, and two Ballast hopper cars used for MOW (also apart of the trade for ex-WMSR 7), one of which is painted in Western Maryland livery while the other was recently repainted in PRR colors. All are privately owned.

Walkersville Southern Railroad Museum
The railroad has a small museum in the former Glade Valley Milling Company building across the street from the 1890s Walkersville Depot.  The museum contains railroad artifacts and a model railroad.

Misc.
The Maryland Midland Railway hosted special excursions prior to the formation of the WS. These were the last passenger operations until 1993. 

The WSRR has two divisions, the North Division and the South Division. These divisions are from the train yard until the end of the line in their respective cardinal directions.

See also

List of heritage railroads in the United States
List of Maryland railroads

References

External links
 Railroad website history material.
 Celebrating 20 Years of Walkersville Southern Railroad! Video notes the project to rebuild the railroad from its derelict state in 1990 .

 HawkinsRails' Walkersville Southern scrapbook

Companies based in Frederick County, Maryland
Museums in Frederick County, Maryland
Tourist attractions in Frederick County, Maryland
Transportation in Frederick County, Maryland
Heritage railroads in Maryland
Railroad museums in Maryland